Qaryat Imam Askar is a place with a very small population in the state/region of Diyala, Iraq.

Diyala Governorate